Midland International Air and Space Port  (formerly Midland International Airport) is in the city limits of Midland, Texas, United States, about midway between Downtown Midland and Downtown Odessa, owned and operated by the City of Midland. In September 2014, it was licensed by the Federal Aviation Administration to serve commercial spaceflight.

Overview
The airport has three airlines, two serving hubs with regional jets and one flying mainline jets. Southwest Airlines is the largest carrier at the airport. In 2012, 497,193 passengers were enplaned.

History

Origins
The airport started as Sloan Field, a small airport started in 1927 by Samuel Addison Sloan. Sloan leased 220 acres of flat grassland from Clarence Scharbauer, a rancher. Sam Sloan died in a plane crash in 1929, and his brother, William Harvey Sloan, continued the operation. In 1939, Harvey Sloan sold the field to the City of Midland for $14,500.

As war clouds gathered over Europe in the late 1930s, Midland businessmen could foresee the possibility of a military base in West Texas and in 1940 they started promoting the airfield for use as a training base to the military establishment in Washington. The airfield was upgraded by the Works Progress Administration with runway and taxiway improvements and lighting. Brigadier General G.C. Brant, Commander of the Gulf Coast Air Corps Training Center at Randolph Field, visited and reported that the situation at Midland was favorable. On June 13, 1941, it was announced that Midland would become a training base, Midland Army Air Field.

World War II

Midland Army Air Field was home to the Army Air Forces Bombardier School, one of a dozen bombardier-training schools. It was one of the "West Texas Bombardier Quadrangle" schools of the Army Air Forces Training Command, along with Childress Army Airfield, San Angelo Army Airfield and Big Spring Army Airfield. The sole purpose of the Bombardier College was to train young men to use the Norden bombsight.

The first group of cadets, Class 42–6, arrived for training from Ellington, Texas, on February 6, 1942. Midland reached a peak base population of more than 4,000 and graduated a total of 6,627 bombardier officers by the conclusion of the training mission on January 1, 1946.

Postwar civil use
The City of Midland annexed much of the land housing the airport on April 26, 1946, while a piece that became a part of a runway was annexed on February 25, 1964.

Midland-Odessa Regional Airport opened its new passenger terminal in the early 1960s. It was served by Continental Airlines and Trans-Texas Airways (and American Airlines, until 1963); the first jets were Continental Boeing 707s in 1965. The terminal had a scalloped roofline, allowing a column-free interior. All services (ticketing, baggage claim and concessions) were inside the building, and a single departure lounge opened onto the apron.

The late 1970s "oil boom" led to economic growth and more flights by incumbent airlines and new entrants like Southwest Airlines; American Airlines returned in June 1981, and America West arrived in 1987.

A new gate area was built along the apron with four second-level gates with jet bridges, concession space and escalator wells linking the addition to the existing terminal. The south end of the main terminal was extended with more ticketing space and the original terminal was modernized (the scalloped roofline was removed).

By the 1990s, several new-entrant carriers had pulled out and most of the rest had downgraded to regional jets; only Southwest, the airport's largest carrier, operated main line jets. The terminal building looked tired, and airport officials began planning a replacement. Construction began (in the infield parking lot) in 1996. The first half of the new terminal opened in early 1999 and the 1966 terminal was demolished. The second half of the new terminal was finished in late 1999. The first airplane built and flown in Texas, the "Pliska" (an approximate copy of the Wright Flyer II) was donated to the airport and is displayed in the terminal over the baggage-claim area.

The Confederate Air Force (now the Commemorative Air Force) moved to Midland in 1991 and holds an annual airshow featuring its warbird aircraft at the airport.

In 2012, the Midland City Council amended a contract allowing three teams of experts – Midland International Airport, Parkhill, and Smith & Cooper – to prepare and submit a commercial space launch site application. On September 17, 2014, the Federal Aviation Administration formally approved the application, making Midland International Airport the first primary commercial service airport to be certified as a spaceport. The original primary purpose of the launch site was to permit XCOR Aerospace to test its reusable winged commercial space vehicle, XCOR Lynx. The company relocated its headquarters to the Midland International Airport from where it had planned to offer commercial space flights. The XCOR research & development facility was planned to be located at the airport as part of a $10 million economic development incentive deal. However, as XCOR has since gone out of business, Midland Development Corp. is looking for other space companies to use the facilities.

Facilities and aircraft

It has four asphalt runways:

 4/22: 
 10/28: 
 16L/34R: 
 16R/34L: 

For the 12-month period ending July 31, 2021, the airport had 58,010 aircraft operations, average 159 per day: 29% military, 39% general aviation, 10% air taxi and 22% airline. 106 aircraft were then based at the airport: 36 single-engine propeller, 37 multi-engine propeller, 30 jet and 3 helicopter.

Airlines and destinations

Passenger

Cargo

Statistics

Top destinations

Airline market share

Accidents and incidents
On November 26, 1983, a Texas Western Aviation Beechcraft King Air crashed on final approach to MAF after initiating a go-around. The plane pitched up in an extremely nose high attitude, entered a left bank, stalled and crashed. All eight occupants (one crew, seven passengers) were killed. The cause was undetermined.

References

External links
 
 
 

1941 establishments in Texas
Buildings and structures in Midland County, Texas
Airports in Texas
Airports in Midland County, Texas
Spaceports in the United States